The Advanced Aviation Cobra was a U.S. ultralight aircraft of extremely minimalist design marketed for homebuilding, developed from the Advanced Aviation Husky. The pilot is seated in an open framework suspended beneath a fabric-covered wing on which the engine (adapted from a snowmobile) and pusher propeller are also mounted. Early Cobras (Model A) had spoilers for roll control, while the Model B had traditional full three-axis control using ailerons. A two-seat training version, known as the King Cobra was also available.

Specifications (Model B)

References

Homebuilt aircraft
1980s United States ultralight aircraft
Single-engined pusher aircraft
Cobra